Rajko Jokanović (Serbian Cyrillic: Рајко Јокановић; born 27 November 1971) is a Serbian volleyball player who competed for Yugoslavia in the 1996 Summer Olympics.

He was born in Belgrade, Yugoslavia (now in Serbia), and played for OK Crvena Zvezda.

In 1996, he was part of the Yugoslav team which won the bronze medal in the Olympic tournament. He played three matches.

References 
 

1971 births
Living people
Serbian men's volleyball players
Serbia and Montenegro men's volleyball players
Yugoslav men's volleyball players
Volleyball players at the 1996 Summer Olympics
Olympic volleyball players of Yugoslavia
Olympic bronze medalists for Federal Republic of Yugoslavia
Olympic medalists in volleyball
Sportspeople from Belgrade
Medalists at the 1996 Summer Olympics
Serbian expatriate sportspeople in France
Serbian expatriate sportspeople in Germany